American: An Odyssey to 1947 is a 2022 Canadian documentary film written, directed, edited, and produced by Danny Wu. The film is a compilation of stories on different Americans, most notably Orson Welles leading to the year 1947. The film premiered at the 2022 Newport Beach Film festival, followed by internationally at the 2023 Thessaloniki Documentary Festival. It was named one of film critic Jonathan Rosenbaum's "Best Films of 2022".

Synopsis 
The film begins by exploring the early rise of Orson Welles, from his rise as a prodigy at the Todd School for Boys, to his arrival in Hollywood to direct Citizen Kane. As the story approaches World War II, a Japanese American boy named Howard Kakita travels abroad, and an African American soldier named Isaac Woodard enlists in the army. The film explores topics such as the Japanese internment camp, the Atomic bombing of Hiroshima, the emergence of the Civil rights movement, and the beginnings of the Cold War. In the end, as one American returns home, another American is forced to exile.

Production 
On November 10, 2021, it was reported that Canadian director Danny Wu would produce a new documentary to be about the politics of Orson Welles, with actor Simon Callow as one of the main storytellers, and that the relatives of Isaac Woodard would also appear in the film. UC Berkley announced on October 22, 2022, that historian Gray Brechin will also be included in the film's storytellers.

Release 
On October 20, 2022, American premiered at the Newport Beach Film Festival. 10 days later, the film premiered at the Austin film festival where it was nominated for the grand jury award for "Best Documentary". On March 5, 2023, the film made their European premiere at the 25th Thessaloniki Documentary Festival.

Reception 
American: An Odyssey to 1947 has received positive reviews from critics. Film critic Tony Williams called it a “remarkable film” that “deserves distribution and future screenings in any respectable film class.” Leda Galanou for Flix reviewed the film as having "surprising depth" and showed "how parallel lives can shape each other without people ever meeting. " Andreas Kyrkos for I Avgi called the film "superbly crafted", and that it "respectfully and historically accurately investigates the hidden events of the 1940s." Jonathan Rosenbaum listed the film on his year end list for the "Best Films of 2022."

References 

2020s Canadian films
2022 documentary films
2022 films
Documentary films about Orson Welles
Documentary films about the United States